Mattate Dam is a buttress dam located in Toyama prefecture in Japan. The dam is used for power production. The catchment area of the dam is 23 km2. The dam impounds about 1  ha of land when full and can store 26 thousand cubic meters of water. The construction of the dam was started on 1927 and completed in 1929.

References

Dams in Toyama Prefecture
1929 establishments in Japan